The Chianina is an Italian breed of large white cattle. It was formerly principally a draught breed; it is now raised mainly for beef. It is the largest and one of the oldest cattle breeds in the world. The bistecca alla fiorentina is produced from its meat.

History 

The Chianina is one of the oldest breeds of cattle. It originates in the area of the Valdichiana, from which it takes its name, and the middle Tiber valley. Chianina cattle have been raised in the Italian regions of Tuscany, Umbria and Lazio for at least 2200 years. Columella, writing about types of oxen in about 55 AD, says "Umbria vastos et albos ..." (VI.I.2), which in the first English translation is "Umbria has such as are huge, and of a white colour".  Chianina oxen were the principal source of agricultural power in the area until displaced by mechanisation and the collapse of the mezzadria system following the Second World War; they were in use in agriculture until at least 1970 and are still used in processions such as the corteo storico of the Palio di Siena. From 1931 breeders began to favour selection of animals more suited to meat production, with shorter limbs, longer bodies and more heavily muscled rump and thighs; recently, selection is based also on factors such as growth rate, meat yield and, in cows, maternal ability.  While one source reports a herdbook dating from 1856, others date the institution of the Libro Genealogico ("genealogical herdbook") to 1933, when a breed standard was established and commissions were set up by the then Ministero dell'Agricoltura e delle Foreste (ministry of agriculture and forestry) to identify, mark and register morphologically suitable animals; the standard of the Chianina breed was fixed by ministerial decree of 7 August 1935.  A private register was previously kept by the largest cattle breeder of the Sienese Valdichiana, the Eredi del conte Bastogi of Abbadia di Montepulciano, and a group of breeders had in 1899 formed a society, the Società degli Agricoltori della Valdichiana (society of farmers of the Valdichiana), of which a principal aim was the establishment of a herdbook.

Since the Second World War the Chianina has become a world breed, raised almost exclusively for its high quality meat. Through exportation of breeding stock, of frozen semen and of embryos, it has reached China, Russia, Asian countries and the Americas.

Breed description 

The Chianina is both the tallest and the heaviest breed of cattle. It is not unusual for bulls to exceed  in weight.
The coat of the Chianina is white; very slight grey shading round the eyes and on the foreparts is tolerated. The skin, muzzle, switch, hooves and the tips of the horns are black, as are the natural openings – the anus, vulva, eyelids, palate, tongue, and lower part of the scrotum.

At the end of 2010 there were 47,236 head registered in Italy, of which more than 90% were in Tuscany, Umbria and Lazio; it is, after the Marchigiana, the second indigenous beef breed of Italy.

Uses

The Chianina is a dual purpose breed, raised both for meat and for draught use; the milk is barely sufficient for suckling.

Draught use

Until recent years, when it was replaced by machinery, the Chianina ox was used with excellent results both in agriculture and for road transport in its area of origin, the provinces of Arezzo, Florence, Livorno, Perugia, Pisa (parts only) and Siena, and in some parts of the more distant provinces of Caserta, Latina and Terni. It was highly adapted to the steep hill terrain and entirely suitable to the farms of the time, to mixed agriculture and to the smallholdings of the mezzadri. A typical casa colonica or rural farmhouse in the area had substantial stabling for oxen on the ground floor, while the habitable part was on the floor above.

At this time four varieties were distinguishable within the breed, based on phenotypic differences resulting from different environments: the Chianina of the Valdichiana, the Chianina of the Valdarno, the Calvana (since 1985 considered a separate breed) in the hilly country of the province of Florence, and the Perugina in the province of Perugia.

The oxen, both male and female, were invariably worked in pairs, yoked with a type of neck yoke. Today Chianina oxen are rarely seen in Italy other than at public events such as the Palio di Siena.

In North America Chianina oxen are trained for participation in ox-pulling contests. Conroy shows a pair pulling  on a stoneboat.

Meat production

They are good foragers and have better resistance to disease and insects than many other domestic cattle.

The meat is renowned for its quality and nutritional values. In Italy it is sold by name at premium prices by approved butchers, the sales receipt detailing the breed, birth and slaughter dates, identification number and other data of the animal in order to guarantee its origin. Each of the 18 principal cuts is branded with the "5R" symbol of the Consorzio Produttori Carne Bovina Pregiata delle Razze Italiane (consortium of producers of quality beef from Italian breeds), signifying the five indigenous beef breeds of Italy, the Chianina, the Marchigiana, the Maremmana, the Romagnola and the Podolica, in accordance with a ministerial decree of 5 July 1984. For the three breeds present in central Italy, the Chianina, the Marchigiana and the Romagnola, there is also an Indicazione Geografica Protetta, or certification of region of origin, in accordance with European Community regulation 2081/92.

Cross-breeding

The Chianina breed is widely used for cross-breeding. In the United States the Chianina has been cross-bred with British breeds to reduce the fat content of meat in line with current fashion; elsewhere it has been used to transmit size, growth-rate and its relatively low skeleton weight to local breeds. It has been found to transmit well qualities such as growth-rate, meat quality, resistance to heat and cold and to insects and disease, and adaptation to rough terrain. Stock cross-bred with the Chianina may reach slaughter weight a month earlier than normal. In 1971 semen was first exported to the United States, where there are now many half-blood and quarter-blood animals. The first American Chianina x Angus calf was born on 31 January 1972 at Tannehill Ranch, near King City, California. Within four years the American Chianina Association had established a Chiangus register, since then the Chiangus has achieved "all but total dominance" in U.S. steer shows. Chianina semen was first imported into Australia in 1973, from Canada; it has since been imported directly from Italy. The Chiangus is an established cross in Australia also.

References

Further reading 

 Elvio Borgioli, Aldo Olivetti (1975). Origini, evoluzione e prospettive attuali e future della razza bovina chianina (in Italian). Bologna: Edagricole.

Cattle breeds
Cattle breeds originating in Italy